Sergio Cervato (22 March 1929 – 9 October 2005) was an Italian footballer who played as a defender.

Club career
Cervato was born in Carmignano di Brenta, province of Padua. Playing for Fiorentina, he formed a formidable defensive partnership with Ardico Magnini; despite being a left-back, however, Cervato often contributed to the Viola's attacks, scoring 31 goals during his 10 years in Florence.

During the 1955–56 Serie A season, Cervato won the Serie A title ("Scudetto") with Fiorentina as the club's captain, his only title with the club; the 1955–56 title-winning side under Fulvio Bernardini lost just one game – the last one at Genoa – and is regarded as one of the best Serie A teams of all time. Following the team's Serie A triumph, the squad narrowly missed out on several more league titles, finishing as runners-up for the next four consecutive years in 1957, 1958, 1959 and 1960. During his time with Fiorentina, Cervato also helped the club to reach the 1957 European Cup Final; despite a strong performance, Fiorentina were defeated 2–0 by Real Madrid.

After leaving the Florence side in 1959, Cervato won 2 more league titles with Fiorentina's rivals Juventus. He ended his career in 1965 with Spal Ferrara in Serie B. In Serie A he played a total of 466 matches and scored 45 goals.

International career
With the Italian national team, Cervato obtained 28 international caps, scored 4 goals, and participated at the 1954 FIFA World Cup.

Style of play
One of the finest defenders of Serie A, Cervato was a quick and tireless competitor. As a left-back, he often contributed to his team's attacks; he also boasted a fierce shot and took both penalties and free-kicks.

Managing career
After he retired, Cervato managed the Pescara, Empoli, and Fiorentina youth teams.

Death
Cervato died at 76 years old in Florence.

Honours
Fiorentina
Serie A Winners: 1955–56; Runner-up: 1956–57, 1957–58, 1958–59
European Cup Runner-up: 1956–57
Coppa Italia Runner-up: 1958–59, 1959–60

Juventus
Serie A Winners: 1959–60, 1960–61
Coppa Italia Winners: 1959–60

References

External links
  Scudetto 1955–56 Team
  Fiorentina All Time Eleven
  All Time Domestic Appearances
  International Appearances

1929 births
2005 deaths
Sportspeople from the Province of Padua
Italian footballers
Italy international footballers
Association football defenders
ACF Fiorentina players
Juventus F.C. players
S.P.A.L. players
1954 FIFA World Cup players
Serie A players
Serie B players
Footballers from Veneto